Lombong (the mine) is a place in Kota Tinggi District, Johor, Malaysia. A waterfall, Kota Tinggi's main attraction, is located nearby. It is named after the small iron ore mine which operates there.

Kota Tinggi District
Populated places in Johor